Amortization or amortisation may refer to:

 The process by which loan principal decreases over the life of an amortizing loan
 Amortization (accounting), the expensing of acquisition cost minus the residual value of intangible assets in a systematic manner, or the completion of such a process
 Amortization (tax law), the cost recovery system for intangible property
 Amortized analysis, a method of analysing execution cost of algorithms
 Amortization (zoning), the time period a non-conforming property has to conform to a new zoning classification before the non-conforming use becomes prohibited